Keithsburg may refer to:

 Keithsburg, Georgia
 Keithsburg, Illinois